HMCS Charlottetown was a  that served the Royal Canadian Navy during the Second World War.

Background

Flower-class corvettes like Charlottetown serving with the Royal Canadian Navy during the Second World War were different from earlier and more traditional sail-driven corvettes. The "corvette" designation was created by the French as a class of small warships; the Royal Navy borrowed the term for a period but discontinued its use in 1877. During the hurried preparations for war in the late 1930s, Winston Churchill reactivated the corvette class, needing a name for smaller ships used in an escort capacity, in this case based on a whaling ship design. The generic name "flower" was used to designate the class of these ships, which – in the Royal Navy – were named after flowering plants.

Corvettes commissioned by the Royal Canadian Navy during the Second World War were named after communities for the most part, to better represent the people who took part in building them. This idea was put forth by Admiral Percy W. Nelles. Sponsors were commonly associated with the community for which the ship was named. Royal Navy corvettes were designed as open sea escorts, while Canadian corvettes were developed for coastal auxiliary roles which was exemplified by their minesweeping gear. Eventually the Canadian corvettes would be modified for better performance on open seas.

Construction
Charlottetown was laid down at Kingston Shipbuilding Ltd., Kingston on 7 June 1941 and launched on 10 September of that year. She was commissioned into the RCN at Quebec City on 13 December and arrived at her homeport of Halifax, Nova Scotia on 18 December 1941.

Atlantic service
Charlottetown served with the Western Local Escort Force (WLEF) until mid-July 1942 when she was transferred to the Gulf Escort Force (GEF), serving in what is now referred to as the Battle of the St. Lawrence. She escorted Quebec City - Sydney convoys until her sinking.

Sinking
She had been returning to base with the minesweeper  after escorting convoy SQ-35 and was not zigzagging. She was struck aft by two torpedoes. She went down fast and though most of her crew got off the ship, some died in the water when her depth charges went off as she sank. Her captain, Lieutenant Commander John W. Bonner, RCNR and 8 other crew were killed out of her crew of 64. The survivors were picked up by Clayoquot.

Notes

References

  HMCS Charlottetown at the Arnold Hague Convoy Database

External links
 HMCS Charlottetown on the Arnold Hague database at convoyweb.org.uk.

Flower-class corvettes of the Royal Canadian Navy
Shipwrecks of the Saint Lawrence River
1941 ships
Ships sunk by German submarines in World War II
Maritime incidents in September 1942